Crystal Lake is an organized hamlet within the Rural Municipality (RM) of Keys No. 303 in the Canadian province of Saskatchewan. It is also recognized as part of a designated place by Statistics Canada. The second part of the designated place (Crystal Lake part B) is on the balance of the shores of Crystal Lake within the adjacent RM of Buchanan No. 304.

Demographics

Organized Hamlet of Crystal Lake (Crystal Lake part A) 

Crystal Lake part B 

References

External links 

 

Designated places in Saskatchewan
Division No. 9, Saskatchewan
Keys No. 303, Saskatchewan
Organized hamlets in Saskatchewan